James Low (1 June 1863 – 29 January 1929) was a Scottish footballer who played as a outside right.

Career
Low played club football for Cambuslang, spending 15 years with the club (though he missed the biggest match in their history, the 1888 Scottish Cup Final), and made one appearance for Scotland in 1891.

He was the elder brother of fellow Scottish international footballer Tommy Low.

References

1863 births
1929 deaths
Footballers from Glasgow
People from Bridgeton, Glasgow
Sportspeople from Cambuslang
Scottish footballers
Scotland international footballers
Cambuslang F.C. players
Association football outside forwards
Scottish Football League players
Footballers from South Lanarkshire